Eugenius Harvey Outerbridge (March 8, 1860 – November 10, 1932) was a businessman and promoter of patent fiberboard, and the first chairman of the interstate agency known then as the Port of New York Authority. The Outerbridge Crossing, a Port Authority bridge, was named for him.

Biography
Eugenius was born on March 8, 1860, in Philadelphia, Pennsylvania, to Bermudians Alexander Ewing Outerbridge I and Laura Catherine Harvey. His sister, Mary Ewing Outerbridge, was the founder, in 1874, of American lawn tennis which was the progenitor of modern tennis. His other siblings include Albert Albany Outerbridge, Sir Joseph Outerbridge (1843–1933), August Emelio Outerbridge (1846–1921), Harriett Harvey Outerbridge, Alexander Ewing Outerbridge II, Laura Catharine Outerbridge and Adolph John Harvey Outerbridge (1858–1928).

Outerbridge incorporated the Agasote Millboard Company in 1909 to produce a high-density fiberboard. The company used the material to produce roof panels for railroad cars and automobiles. In 1916, the company introduced Vehisote, a versatile fiberboard  made from recycled materials, made by the company in West Trenton, New Jersey. Both the product and the company were later renamed as Homasote, and remain in active production .

Outerbridge was the first chairman of the Port of New York Authority, now the Port Authority of New York and New Jersey. The new authority was founded on April 30, 1921, and was the first interstate agency created under a clause of the US Constitution permitting compacts between states.

Outerbridge was among the founding organizers of the Richmond County Country Club on Staten Island in 1888. He was a longtime member of the Union Club of the City of New York and, until his death, he was chairman of the Building Committee in charge of planning the 69th Street clubhouse.

He died on November 10, 1932, at 950 Park Avenue in Manhattan, New York City.

Legacy
The Outerbridge Crossing, a toll bridge between Staten Island, New York, and Perth Amboy, New Jersey, is named in his honor. It opened on June 29, 1928.

Timeline
 1860 Birth
 1880  with Eugenius Outerbridge
 1909 Starts Agasote Millboard Company
 1916 Homasote
 1921 Starts tenure at Port of New York Authority
 1924 Ends tenure at Port of New York Authority
 1928 Outerbridge Crossing named for him on June 20
 1932 Death

See also
Austin Tobin
Robert Moses
Othmar Ammann
Christopher O. Ward

References

External links
 

1860 births
1932 deaths
Businesspeople from Philadelphia
Port Authority of New York and New Jersey people
American people of Bermudian descent
Chairmen of the Port Authority of New York and New Jersey